David Douglas Diehl (September 30, 1918 – September 15, 1994) was an American football player. He played college football for Michigan State College (later known as Michigan State University). He also played professional football in the National Football League for the Detroit Lions from 1939 to 1940 and 1944 to 1945. He also served as the Michigan State Spartans' ends coach in 1941. In 1944, he ranked third in the NFL with 426 receiving yards and led the league with an average of 23.7 yards per reception.

References

1918 births
1994 deaths
American football ends
Michigan State Spartans football players
Detroit Lions players
Players of American football from Michigan
People from Dansville, Michigan